Çetin İnanç (Born in Ankara on 12 September 1941) is a Turkish film director who has directed movies for the past five decades. He is infamously known as the director of Dünyayı Kurtaran Adam (1982), aka "Turkish Star Wars"

Biography 
Inanç spent his youth pursuing a career in Law, and later abandoned his career.  He began his cinema career as the assistant of well-known Turkish director Atıf Yılmaz. In 1967 he made his first movie Çelik Bilek based on an Italian comics character.  He quickly moved into the niche market of producing erotica, but was dissuaded from that path as military took over in Turkey and passed several censorship laws against adult movies.  His next venture was action movies, including his most famous work Dünyayı Kurtaran Adam (English: "The Man Who Saved The World"), a low-budget space saga infamously dubbed the "Turkish Star Wars".

Today, Çetin İnanç continues to direct, although his passion has since been funnelled into Turkish television programmes likes Çılgın Bediş and the more recent Karaoğlan.

He was nicknamed as "jet director" in Turkish cinema circles since he shot most of his films in around 10 days.

Filmography 
 Killing Canilere Karşı - 1967
 Çelik Bilek - 1967
 Kral Kim - 1968
 Kızıl Maske - 1968
 Asi Kabadayı - 1969
 Asrın Kralı - 1969
 Demir Pençe - 1969
 Demir Pençe Casuslar Savaşı - 1969
 Devlerin Öcü - 1969
 Garibanlar Mahallesi - 1969
 Hedefte Vuruşanlar - 1969
 Ölüm Şart Oldu - 1970
 Altın Tabancalı Ajan - 1970
 Hoş Memo - 1970
 Püsküllü Bela - 1970
 Kanıma Kan İsterim - 1970
 Kiralık Katiller - 1970
 Kralların Kaderi Değişmez - 1970
 Çeko - 1970
 Cehennemde Şenlik Var - 1970
 Ölüm Çemberi - 1970
 Kara Memed - 1971
 Allah Benimle - 1971
 Avare Kalbim - 1971
 Zehir Hafiye - 1971
 Ölüm Bana Vız Gelir - 1971
 Şerefimle Yaşarım - 1971
 Cemo İle Cemile - 1971
 Hedefte İmzam Var - 1971
 Kinova - 1971
 Bombala Oski Bombala - 1972
 Kamçılı Kadın - 1972
 Kan Dökmez Remzi - 1972
 Kara Şeytan - 1972
 Tophaneli Murat - 1972
 Fosforlu Melek - 1972
 Görevimiz Tehlike - 1972
 Çapkın Hafiye - 1972
 Ölüm Benden Korksun
 Üç Silahşörler - 1972
 Üç Silahşörlerin İntikamı - 1972
 Affedilmeyenler - 1972
 Beddua / Günahsız Kadın - 1973
 Bilal-i Habeşi - 1973
 Dağ Kurdu  - 1973
 Destan - 1973
 Kader Çıkmazı - 1973
 Kara Haydar - 1973
 Maceraya Bayılırım - 1973
 Mağrur Ve Cesur - 1973
 Sevginin Bedeli - 1973
 Yunus Emre Destanı - 1973
 Bahriyeli Kemal - 1974
 Karaların Ali - 1974
 Reşo: Vatan İçin - 1974
 Yolsuzlar - 1974
 İntikam - 1974
 Şehitler - 1974
 Ah Ne Adem Dilli Badem - 1975
 Bana Beş Avrat Yetmez - 1975
 Halime'nin Kızları - 1975
 Kral Benim - 1975
 Sefer Seferde - 1975
 Seveceksen Sev Artık - 1975
 Sıra Sende Yosma - 1975
 Çapkınım Hovardayım - 1975
 Şipşak Basarım - 1975
 Cezanı Çekeceksin - 1976
 Eden Bulur - 1976
 Gurbetçiler Dönüyor - 1976
 Günah - 1976
 Kader Bu - 1976
 Kanundan Kaçamazsın - 1976
 Kaybolan Saadet - 1976
 Kayıkçının Küreği - 1976
 Korkunç Şüphe - 1976
 Kıvrıl Fakat Kırılma - 1976
 Sokak Kadını - 1976
 Yumurtanın Sarısı - 1976
 Söyleyin Anama Ağlamasın - 1976
 Yalan - 1976
 İşler Karıştı / Zühtü - 1976
 Akdeniz Kartalı - 1976
 Aşk Dönemeci - 1976
 Enayiler Kralı - 1976
 Garip - 1977
 Gönül Ferman Dinlemez - 1977
 Son Gülen Tam Güler - 1977
 Vur Gözünün Üstüne - 1977
 Yaşamak Güzel Şey - 1977
 Çifte Nikah - 1977
 Aşkın Kanunu - 1978
 Aşkın Sıcaklığı - 1978
 Bir Daha Affetmem - 1978
 El Bebek Gül Bebek - 1978
 Ilık Dudaklar - 1978
 Kalp Kalbe Karşıdır - 1978
 Ya Şundadır Ya Bunda - 1978
 Yüz Karası - 1978
 Ne Olacak Şimdi - 1978
 Zor Oyunu Bozar - 1978
 Seven Unutmaz - 1978
 Çıldırtan Kadın / Sevmek mi Öl... - 1978
 Ölüm Yarışı - 1979
 Afferin Çocuğa - 1979
 Bal Badem - 1979
 Hayat Kadını / Sürtük - 1979
 Püsküllü Bela / Dilberim Kıyma... - 1979
 Seven Sevene - 1979
 Aşk Pınarı - 1981
 Hamaylı Boynundayım - 1981
 Kara Bahtım - 1981
 Seviyorum Allahım - 1981
 Su - 1981
 Dört Yanım Cehennem - 1982
 Bizim Mahalle - 1982
 Kelepçe - 1982
 Kimsesizler - 1982
 Gırgır Ali - 1982
 Son Savaşçı - 1982
 Dünyayı Kurtaran Adam - 1982
 Ölümsüz - 1982
 Ölüme Son Adım - 1983
 Çöl - 1983
 En Büyük Yumruk - 1983
 Erkekçe - 1983
 İdamlık - 1983
 Vahşi Kan - 1983
 İntikam Benim - 1983
 Aç Kartallar - 1984
 Ölüm Savaşçısı - 1984
 Yetim Emrah - 1984
 Dev Kanı - 1984
 Deli Fişek - 1984
 Kara Şimşek 1 - 1985
 Kaplanlar - 1985
 Bin Defa Ölürüm - 1985
 Son Darbe - 1985
 Asi Kabadayı - 1986
 Korkusuz - 1986
 Ölüm Vuruşu - 1986
 İntikamcı - 1986
 11 Ayın Sultanı Ramazan - 1987
 Polis - 1992 (TV series)
 Kumarbaz - 1993 (TV series)
 Merhamet - 1993 (TV series)
 Şişeler - 1993 (TV series)
 Uyuşturucu - 1994 (TV series)
 Kızım Osman - 1998 (TV series)

References

External links

 My Space profile:  http://www.myspace.com/cetininanc
 Kamera Arkası profile: https://web.archive.org/web/20080422063507/http://www.kameraarkasi.org/yonetmenler/cc/cetininanc.html (in Turkish)

Inanç, Çetin
Inanc, Cetin
Inanç, Çetin
Inanç, Çetin